The 2020 LCK season was the ninth year of South Korea's LCK, a professional esports league for the MOBA PC game League of Legends.

The spring split began on 5 February and was scheduled to end with the spring finals on 13 April; however, the regular season was suspended for two weeks due to the COVID-19 pandemic in South Korea, and the split instead concluded on 25 April.

The summer split began on 17 June and concluded with the summer finals on 5 September.

Spring

Promotion

Regular season

Playoffs

Summer

Promotion

Regular season

Playoffs

References 

League of Legends
2020 multiplayer online battle arena tournaments
League of Legends Champions Korea seasons
League of Legends Champions Korea season, 2020